Hulboaca may refer to several places in Moldova:

 Hulboaca, a village in Grătieşti Commune, Sectorul Rîşcani of Chişinău municipality
 Hulboaca, a village in Ghetlova Commune, Orhei district